The Delaware County Office of the Medical Examiner is the office responsible for the investigation of all unnatural deaths in Delaware County, Pennsylvania (not purely from natural causes) and natural deaths where there is no treating doctor or which occur suddenly outside a medical institution.

Prior to 1979, the office was known as the Delaware County Coroner's Office. In 1979, the county updated the medicolegal death investigation system to a modernized Medical Examiner system in response to public demand, and facilitated by the home rule charter. The Administrative Headquarters of the office is located within the Fair Acres Complex in Lima, with a connected morgue building.

Organization
The Office of the Medical Examiner is staffed by five Board Certified Forensic Pathologists, a Chief Investigator, several Medicolegal Investigators, an autopsy technician, an office manager, and an office administrator.  The Office is currently headed by Dr. Frederic Hellman, Chief Medical Examiner and Dr. Bennett Preston, Deputy Chief Medical Examiner.

References

Forensics organizations
Medical examiners